The 2011 Northern Illinois Huskies football team represented Northern Illinois University as a member of the West Division of the Mid-American Conference (MAC) during the 2011 NCAA Division I FBS football season. Led by first-year head coach Dave Doeren, the Huskies compiled an overall record of 11–3 with a mark of 7–1 in conference play, sharing the MAC West Division title with Toledo. By virtue of their head-to-head win over Toledo, Northern Illinois advance to the MAC Championship Game, where the defeated Ohio to win the program's second MAC title. The Huskies were invited to the GoDaddy.com Bowl, where they beat Arkansas State. The was season fourth consecutive in which Northern Illinois made a trip to a bowl game. The team played home games at Huskie Stadium in DeKalb, Illinois.

Schedule

Game summaries

Army

Kansas

Wisconsin

Cal Poly

Central Michigan

Kent State

Western Michigan

Buffalo

Toledo

Bowling Green

Ball State

Eastern Michigan

Ohio (2011 MAC Championship Game)

Arkansas State (2012 GoDaddy.com Bowl)

Statistics

Points by quarter

References

Northern Illinois
Northern Illinois Huskies football seasons
Mid-American Conference football champion seasons
LendingTree Bowl champion seasons
Northern Illinois Huskies football